Profane is a 2011 independent film directed by Usama Alshaibi. The film won "2011 Best of Fest Feature" of Boston Underground Film Festival.

Cast
Manal Kara as Muna
Molly Plunk as Mary
Dejan Mircea as Ali
Other appearances (alphabetically): Jessica Bailey, Golbon Eghtedari, Kiel Frieden, Kiel Frieder, Bret Koontz, Nigel Murphy, Celina Paddock, Edward Salem, Stephan Wozniak

References 

Dangerous Minds.com: Profane: The transgressive cinema of Usama Alshaibi
Usama Alshaibi blog: Profane - review in Boston Phoenix

External links

2011 films
American independent films
Films directed by Usama Alshaibi
2010s American films